Devin Anthony Vassell (born August 23, 2000) is an American professional basketball player for the San Antonio Spurs of the National Basketball Association (NBA). He played college basketball for the Florida State Seminoles.

Early life and high school career
Vassell grew up in Suwanee, Georgia and attended Peachtree Ridge High School. As a senior, Vassell averaged 21.6 points and 8.9 rebounds per game and was named the regional Player of the Year by the Gwinnett Daily Post. Vassell committed to play college basketball at Florida State over offers from Texas Tech, North Florida, and Stetson.

College career
As a true freshman, Vassell averaged 4.5 points and 1.5 rebounds per game and led all ACC freshman with a .419 three-point shooting percentage. He scored a season-high 16 points on December 17, 2018 in a win over Southeast Missouri State. Vassell made a three-pointer with 4.5 seconds left in regulation to force overtime in the Seminoles' 65–63 win over Virginia Tech in the quarterfinals of the 2019 ACC men's basketball tournament.

He was named a starter for the Seminoles' going into his sophomore season. Vassell was named the Most Outstanding Player of the 2019 Emerald Coast Classic after scoring 16 points against Chicago State, 13 against 17th-ranked Tennessee and 13 points against Purdue in the final. Midway through the season Vassell's play lead him to be considered as a potential first round pick in the 2020 NBA draft. He scored a career-high 18 points against Virginia in a 54–50 victory and set a new career high the next game with 23 points and 11 rebounds against Miami and was named the ACC co-Player of the Week. Vassell surpassed his previous career high with 27 points while going 7–for–7 on three point shots against Virginia Tech on February 1, 2020. Vassell missed a game against Syracuse for undisclosed reasons on February 15. At the conclusion of the regular season, Vassell was selected to the Second Team All-ACC. He led the team in scoring with 12.7 points per game and in rebounding with 5.1 per game and was second on the team in blocks (29), assists (49) and steals (42). Following the end of the season, Vassell announced that he would enter the 2020 NBA draft.

Professional career

San Antonio Spurs (2020–present)
Vassell was selected by the San Antonio Spurs with the 11th overall pick in the 2020 NBA draft. On November 27, he signed with the Spurs. Vassell made his NBA debut on December 23, recording three points and three rebounds in a 131–119 win over the Memphis Grizzlies. On April 17, 2021, he scored a season-high 18 points, alongside three rebounds, two assists and two blocks, in a 111–85 win over the Phoenix Suns.

On February 26, 2022, Vassell scored a regular season-high 22 points, alongside five rebounds and four assists, in a 129–133 loss to the Miami Heat. On April 1, he again scored 22 points, alongside four rebounds and three assists, in a 130–111 win over the Portland Trail Blazers. Despite a season-high 23 points, alongside two rebounds and three assists, from Vassell, the Spurs were defeated by the New Orleans Pelicans in the play-in tournament with a 103–113 loss. The loss eliminated the Spurs from a chance to get a spot in the playoffs.

On November 4, 2022, Vassell scored a career-high 29 points, alongside two rebounds and two assists, in a 106–113 loss to the Los Angeles Clippers. On November 17, he again scored 29 points, alongside three rebounds and three assists, in a 112–130 loss to the Sacramento Kings.

Career statistics

NBA

|-
| style="text-align:left;"| 2020–21
| style="text-align:left;"| San Antonio
| 62 || 7 || 17.0 || .406 || .347 || .843 || 2.8 || .9 || .7 || .3 || 5.5
|-
| style="text-align:left;"| 2021–22
| style="text-align:left;"| San Antonio
| 71 || 32 || 27.3 || .427 || .361 || .838 || 4.3 || 1.9 || 1.1 || .6 || 12.3
|- class="sortbottom"
| style="text-align:center;" colspan="2"| Career
| 133 || 39 || 22.5 || .421 || .357 || .840 || 3.6 || 1.4 || .9 || .4 || 9.1

College

|-
| style="text-align:left;"| 2018–19
| style="text-align:left;"| Florida State
| 33 || 0 || 10.7 || .437 || .419 || .679 || 1.5 || .6 || .5 || .3 || 4.5
|-
| style="text-align:left;"| 2019–20
| style="text-align:left;"| Florida State
| 30 || 30 || 28.8 || .490 || .415 || .738 || 5.1 || 1.6 || 1.4 || 1.0 || 12.7
|- class="sortbottom"
| style="text-align:center;" colspan="2"| Career
| 63 || 30 || 19.3 || .475 || .417 || .720 || 3.2 || 1.1 || 1.0 || .6 || 8.4

Personal life
Vassell's father, Andrew Vassell, played college basketball at Stony Brook.

References

External links

Florida State Seminoles bio

2000 births
Living people
African-American basketball players
American men's basketball players
Basketball players from Georgia (U.S. state)
Florida State Seminoles men's basketball players
People from Suwanee, Georgia
San Antonio Spurs draft picks
San Antonio Spurs players
Shooting guards
Sportspeople from the Atlanta metropolitan area
21st-century African-American sportspeople
20th-century African-American sportspeople
American people of Jamaican descent